Brunet is a commune in the Alpes-de-Haute-Provence department in southeastern France.

Geography
The village lies on the left bank of the Asse, which forms most of the commune's northern border.

Population

See also
Communes of the Alpes-de-Haute-Provence department

References

Communes of Alpes-de-Haute-Provence
Alpes-de-Haute-Provence communes articles needing translation from French Wikipedia